Earl of Carrick (or Mormaer of Carrick) is the title applied to the ruler of Carrick (now South Ayrshire), subsequently part of the Peerage of Scotland. The position came to be strongly associated with the Scottish crown when Robert the Bruce, who had inherited it from his maternal kin, became King of the Scots in the early 14th century. Since the 15th century, the title of Earl of Carrick has automatically been held by the heir apparent to the throne, thus the current holder of the title is Prince William, Duke of Rothesay.

Early rulers

The earldom emerged in 1186, out of the old Lordship of Galloway, which had previously encompassed all of what is now known as Galloway as well as the southern part of Ayrshire. Though the Lords of Galloway recognised the King of Scots as their overlord, their lordship was effectively a separate kingdom, and had its own laws. The first Lord recorded is Fergus, who died in 1161 leaving two sons: Uchtred and Gille Brigte (Gilbert). As was the custom then, the two brothers shared the lordship and the lands between them. In 1174, they joined with King William the Lion in his invasion of Northumberland. However, after King William was taken prisoner by the English, the Galwegians broke into rebellion. Uchtred, who remained loyal to the Scottish king, was savagely murdered by Gille Brigte's son Máel Coluim, and Gille Brigte took control of the entirety of Galloway. In 1175, King William was restored to liberty, and he marched an army into Galloway to bring justice upon Gille Brigte. However, he seems to have contented himself with exacting a fine, leaving Gille Brigte to go unharmed.

In 1176, Gille Brigte obtained an agreement with King Henry II of England, in which he became his vassal; in exchange, he paid the English king the then enormous sum of £919 9s. and gave his son Duncan (Donnchadh) as a hostage. Gille Brigte then spent the next decade carrying out devastating raids on King William's territory, with the protection of the English.

Gille Brigte's death in 1185 was the signal for general turmoil amongst the Galwegians. Roland, son of the murdered Uchtred, defeated the supporters of Gille Brigte in 1185, and planted forts across Galloway to secure his authority. This angered King Henry, and he marched a large force to Carlisle in preparation for invasion. However, war was averted at a meeting between Roland, William and Henry, when it was agreed that Roland would rule the main part of Galloway, while Gille Brigte's son Duncan would rule the northern section, known as Carrick. Duncan agreed to these terms, and renounced all claims to the Lordship of Galloway, becoming the first Earl of Carrick.

Duncan married Avelina, daughter of Alan, High Steward of Scotland. His son or grandson Niall's eldest daughter Marjorie succeeded him, becoming Countess of Carrick in her own right. She married firstly Adam de Kilconquhar. In 1269, Adam journeyed to the Holy Land under the banners of King Louis IX of France, as part of the Eighth Crusade. He never returned, dying of disease at Acre in 1270. The next year, the widowed Countess happened to meet Robert de Brus hunting in her lands. According to legend, Marjorie imprisoned Robert until he agreed to marry her. They were married at Turnberry Castle, without their families' knowledge or the requisite consent of the King. When news got out, Alexander III seized her castles and estates, but she later atoned for her foolishness with a fine, and Robert was recognised as her husband and Earl of Carrick jure uxoris. They had five sons and five daughters: Robert, Edward, Thomas, Alexander, Nigel, Isabel, Mary, Christina, Matilda and Margaret.

Royal earls

Marjorie and Robert were succeeded by their eldest son. When the old House of Dunkeld became extinct, this Robert, known as "the Bruce", became a principal candidate for the throne as the great-great-great-great grandson of David I. He was crowned at Scone in 1306, causing his Scots titles (Earl of Carrick and Lord of Annandale) to merge into the Crown. The title of Baron Bruce in the Peerage of England, in so far as it existed, "would either have been forfeited in 1306, or after the death ... of ... King David II , 22 Feb 1371, would, according to modern doctrine, have fallen into abeyance between [Robert I's] daughters and coheirs, the sisters of the late King."

Around 1313, King Robert made his younger brother Edward the Earl of Carrick. Edward had no issue, save a natural son he had by Lady Isabella Strathbogie, daughter of John, Earl of Atholl. The title therefore became extinct on his death at the Battle of Faughart in 1318.

After briefly being held by Robert's son David prior to his accession to the throne, the title was granted in 1332 to Alexander, Edward's bastard. However, Alexander was killed the next year at the Battle of Halidon Hill and the title again became extinct.

In 1368, King David created his great-nephew John Stewart the Earl of Carrick. David died unexpectedly in 1371. He had no children, meaning he was succeeded by his nephew Robert Stewart, John's father. After Robert's death in 1390, John succeeded him, taking the regnal name Robert III; thus the Earldom of Carrick again merged with the Crown.

The title was next held by Robert III's son David, who was also created Duke of Rothesay and Earl of Atholl. David died childless in 1402, and the Earldom was regranted to his brother James; however he was generally known by the higher title Prince or Great Steward of Scotland. James acceded to the throne in 1406, and his titles merged with the Crown.

In 1469, the Scottish Parliament passed an Act declaring that the eldest son of the king and heir to the throne would automatically hold the earldom, along with the dukedom of Rothesay. After the Union of the Crowns of Scotland and England, the dukedom and earldom have been held by the eldest son and heir apparent of the monarchs of Great Britain. Thus, the current Duke of Rothesay and Earl of Carrick is Prince William, Duke of Rothesay.

Creation of 1628
In 1628, King Charles I created John Stewart the Earl of Carrick. He had already been made Lord Kincleven in 1607, also in the Peerage of Scotland. He was a younger son of Robert, Earl of Orkney, bastard son of King James V; thus, he was Charles's half-great-uncle. This title was deemed not to conflict with the Earldom of Carrick held by the heir to the throne, as it referred not to the province in Ayrshire, but to the lands of Carrick on Eday in Orkney.

John Stewart married Lady Elizabeth Southwell, daughter of Charles Howard, Earl of Nottingham, and widow of Sir Robert Southwell. By her, he had one daughter, Margaret. He is also known to have had two natural children: a son, named Henry, and a daughter, whose name is unknown. As he had no legitimate son, his titles became extinct on his death around 1645.

List of holders

Early rulers
Gille Brigte (d. 1185), ruled without comital title
Donnchadh, Earl of Carrick (d. 1250)
Niall, Earl of Carrick (d. 1256)
Marjorie, Countess of Carrick (d. 1292)

Bruce earls
Robert Bruce (1292–1314), became King Robert I of Scotland on 1306, died in 1329.
Edward Bruce (1314–1318), Robert's brother, became High-King of Ireland in 1315, died in 1318.
reverted to crown
David Bruce (1328–1330) – became King David II of Scotland in 1329, died in 1371.
Alexander de Brus, Earl of Carrick (1330–1333), illegitimate son of Edward Bruce, died in 1333.
Eleanor Bruce, daughter of Alexander, married William de Cunningham. 
reverted to crown

Stewart earls
Robert Stewart, Earl of Carrick (1316–1390) [reigned as King Robert II of Scotland from 1371 to his death as the first monarch of the House of Stewart]
John Stewart, Earl of Carrick (c. 1368–1390) [became King Robert III of Scotland in 1390]
David Stewart, Duke of Rothesay (1398–1402)
reverted to crown
James Stewart, Duke of Rothesay (1404–1437) [became King James I of Scotland in 1406]

Later earls 
See Duke of Rothesay for further Earls of Carrick.

1628 earldom 
John Stewart, Earl of Carrick (this earldom refers to the lands of Carrick on Eday in Orkney, not Carrick in Ayrshire)

Family tree

See also
Earl of Orkney
Ayrshire (Earl of Carrick's Own) Yeomanry
Duchy of Cornwall

References 

 Anderson, Rev'd John; Balfour Paul, Sir James; Steuart, Archibald Francis (1905) The Scots Peerage Vol. II pp. 421–42. Edinburgh: David Douglas.
 Anderson, Rev'd John (1907) "Ancient Lords of Galloway" in The Scots Peerage Vol. IV pp. 135–8 
 Irvine, James M. (ed.) (2006) The Orkneys and Schetland in Blaeu's Atlas Novus of 1654. Ashtead: James M. Irvine. 
 Thomson, William P. L. (2008) The New History of Orkney. Edinburgh: Birlinn. 

Earldoms in the Peerage of Scotland
 
Noble titles created in 1186
Noble titles created in 1398
Succession to the British crown
Charles III
British and Irish peerages which merged in the Crown